Andrew Lysaght (1 October 1832 – 3 September 1906) was an Australian politician.

Born in Fairy Meadow, he spent many years as a publican of the Queens Hotel in Wollongong. An alderman of Northern Illawarra Council who served several terms as mayor, he was elected to the New South Wales Legislative Assembly in 1885 as the member for Illawarra, serving until 1887. He later served a second term from June to September 1891 before his election was voided. Lysaght died at Fairy Meadow in 1906.

References

 

1832 births
1906 deaths
Members of the New South Wales Legislative Assembly
Mayors of places in New South Wales
19th-century Australian politicians